Paul Maher Jr. (born 1963) is an author, book critic, photographer and filmmaker best known for his published books about Jack Kerouac.

Early life and education
Paul Maher Jr. was born in Amarillo, Texas, where his father was stationed in the Air Force. Shortly afterwards the family moved to Lowell, Massachusetts, where Maher remained through childhood. Upon graduating from Dracut High School, he joined the United States Navy where he served in the Persian Gulf aboard the USS Ramsey. Upon discharge, Maher returned to Lowell. He attended Middlesex Community College and the University of Massachusetts Lowell, where he obtained an undergraduate degree in American studies. He later completed a master's degree in Education with a concentration in English.

Career
From 2004 through the present, Maher authored and edited five books for publication. Maher is also rewriting his book on the real-life adventures of Jack Kerouac's On the Road. Ongoing projects are his transcriptions and annotations of the unpublished Extracts Related to the Indians by Henry David Thoreau, and Kalendar (working title) a film project based on Thoreau's natural history writings. He is also researching and writing a book on Terrence Malick's 2017 film, The Voyage of Time.

Published works 
 2004 Kerouac: The Definitive Biography (Taylor Trade Publishing)
 2005 Empty Phantoms: Interviews and Encounters with Jack Kerouac (Thunder's Mouth Press)
 2007 Jack Kerouac's American Journey: The Real-Life Odyssey of On the Road (Thunder's Mouth Press)
 2007 Kerouac: His Life and Work (Taylor Trade Publishing) (revised, formerly Kerouac: The Definitive Biography)
 2008 Extracts Related to the Indians - Notebook One by H.D. Thoreau ed. & annotated by P. Maher Jr.
 2008 Extracts Related to the Indians - Notebook Two by H.D. Thoreau ed. & annotated by P. Maher Jr.
 2009 Miles on Miles: Interviews and Encounters with Miles Davis (Chicago Review Press)ed. by P. Maher Jr. and Michael K. Dorr
 2011 Tom Waits on Tom Waits: Interviews and Encounters (Chicago Review Press) 
 2012 One Big Soul: An Oral History of Terrence Malick
 2013 Burning Furiously Beautiful: The True Story of Jack Kerouac's On the Road (with Stephanie Nikolopoulos)

Forthcoming work 
 2014 Kalendar (a film)
 I Am the Revolutionary: Young Jack Kerouac (2017)
 Terrence Malick's Voyage of Time (2018)

Publishers 
 Thunder's Mouth Press
 Taylor Trade Publishing
 Southern Illinois University Press
 Chicago Review Press
 Da Capo Press
 American Renaissance Press

Personal life 
Maher is the father of two daughters, Rachel and Chloe.

References

American male writers
Living people
1963 births
People from Amarillo, Texas
Writers from Massachusetts
Middlesex Community College (Massachusetts) alumni
University of Massachusetts Lowell alumni